Arnold Leslie Pearce (20 April 1887 – 17 August 1977) was a New Zealand film director, who directed numerous short films in Hollywood during the 1930s, including several with W.C. Fields and Bing Crosby.

Selected filmography
 The Delightful Rogue (1929)
 Meet the Wife (1931)
 The Dentist (1932)
 Blue of the Night (1933)
 The Stoker (1935)
 Can You Hear Me, Mother? (1935)
 You Must Get Married (1936)
 The Road to Hollywood (1947)

References

External links

1887 births
1977 deaths
People from Christchurch
New Zealand film directors
New Zealand expatriates in the United States